Zhuhai No.3 High School (ZH3Z; ; colloquially known as 珠海三中, Zhūhǎi Sānzhōng) is located in Xiangzhou, Zhuhai, Guangdong.

References

Senior secondary schools in China
Schools in Guangdong
Secondary Education in Zhuhai